Rogues in Lankhmar is an accessory for the 2nd edition of the Advanced Dungeons & Dragons fantasy role-playing game based on Fritz Leiber's Lankhmar setting.

Contents
A block of adventure hooks follows each guild, NPC, and location description. The last chapter offers tips for handling hard-to-please players.

Publication history
Rogues in Lankhmar was written by Wes Nicholson and published by TSR, Inc. The cover art was by Larry Elmore.

Reception
Rick Swan reviewed Rogues in Lankhmar for Dragon magazine #216 (April 1995). He comments that "Dungeon Masters who've enjoyed the previous volumes in the Lankhmar series (including Tales of. . . and Slayers of. . .) but still don't know how to get a campaign off the ground should appreciate the focused approach of the latest entry." He felt that the adventure hooks would help in "making it a snap for DMs to develop encounters geared to the interests of their players". Swan concludes by saying, "The result: sophisticated, intelligent role-playing for those more interested in negotiating treaties than scalping orcs."

References

Dungeons & Dragons sourcebooks
Role-playing game supplements introduced in 1994